Following Western Australia's convict era, 37 ex-convicts were appointed school teachers in the colony.  The appointment of such a large number of ex-convicts to what was considered a respectable government position was highly unusual for a penal colony, as the social stigma of conviction usually excluded ex-convicts from such positions.

The appointment of a large number of ex-convicts as school teachers was largely due to the poor levels of education in the generation of Western Australians who had been children when the Swan River Colony was first settled. Many of them were illiterate or barely literate, and so unsuitable for appointment as school teachers. Those settlers who did have a good education were in high demand, and were not attracted to the low wages offered for teachers.  On the other hand, educated convicts had little prospect of obtaining better wages or conditions than those available to teachers, and the position offered a chance to overcome the social stigma of conviction and obtain a respectable position in society.  Although some settlers considered ex-convicts unfit to become teachers, most parents preferred that their children be educated by ex-convicts than not at all.  Consequently, a total of 37 convicts were appointed school teachers in Western Australia between 1853 and 1900. Erickson (1983) has suggested that the use of ex-convict school teachers played an important role in the gradual breaking down of the social stigma of convictism.

List of ex-convict school teachers of Western Australia
This is a list of ex-convict school teachers of Western Australia. Unless otherwise noted, all information comes from Rica Erickson's The Brand On His Coat and the convict ship passenger lists provided on the Western Australian Convicts 1850-1868  website.

References

Australian schoolteachers
Convictism in Western Australia
Lists of Australian people by occupation
Western Australia-related lists
Australia education-related lists
Lists of educators
Australian crime-related lists